Gerke may refer to:
 Friedrich Clemens Gerke (22 January 1801 – 21 May 1888) – German writer, journalist, musician and pioneer of telegraph
 Jack Gerke (1916–2005) – Australian Second World War and Korean War veteran